List of modern equipment in service in the Brazilian Army.

Infantry weapons

Pistols

Submachine guns

Service rifles

Shotguns

Machine guns

Sniper rifles

Grenade launchers

Grenades and mines

Anti-armour

Light infantry mortars

Protective gear

Other equipment

Missiles and rockets

Missiles

Rockets

Armored vehicles

Main battle tanks

Tank destroyers

Infantry fighting vehicles and armored personnel carriers

Infantry mobility vehicles

Artillery

Rocket artillery

Self-propelled artillery

Towed artillery

Towed mortar

Anti-aircraft systems

Surface-to-air gun systems

Surface-to-air missile systems

Mobile surveillance radars

Engineering vehicles

Armored vehicles

Logistic support

Unarmored vehicles

Trucks

Buses

Administrative vehicles and light vehicles

Motorcycles

Boats

Aircraft

Unmanned aerial vehicles

See also
Brazilian Armed Forces
Currently active military equipment by country

References

Brazilian Army
Military equipment of Brazil
Brazil
Equipment